John Fane may refer to:

John Fane, 7th Earl of Westmorland (1685–1762)
John Fane, 9th Earl of Westmorland (1728–1774) 
John Fane, 10th Earl of Westmorland (1759–1841) 
John Fane, 11th Earl of Westmorland (1784–1859) 
John Fane (1751–1824), MP
John Fane (1775–1850), MP, son of the above
John Fane (1804–1875), MP, son of the above